Ruth N. Edelman was an American Republican politician from Sheridan, Wyoming. She represented the Sheridan district in the Wyoming House of Representatives in 1938.

References

Year of birth missing
Year of death missing
Members of the Wyoming House of Representatives
Women state legislators in Wyoming
20th-century American women politicians
People from Sheridan, Wyoming